Pelahatchie High School, also known as Pelahatchie Attendance Center, is located in Pelahatchie, Mississippi, serving students in grades 712 and having a population of about 380 students.

History 
The school was established within the 1870s. By 1891, Pelahatchie was one of the only three schools in the Rankin Country area.  Today, the school is part of the Rankin County School District, which serves 28 schools in Mississippi.

Athletics
Pelahatchie High School features several athletic programs, including football, cheerleading, girls and boys basketball, girls and boys soccer, slow pitch and fast pitch softball, baseball, tennis, and archery.

Clubs and organizations
The school has several clubs on campus which include Student Council, FFA, FCA, Beta Club, print journalism, book club, JROTC, and yearbook.

Performing arts
The Pelahatchie High School Band is under the direction of Helen Rettger, a graduate of the University of Southern Mississippi. Rettger has been director of the band since the re-establishment of the band in August 2015, after it was discontinued in the early 1990s,.

Awards and recognition
 Governors Award for Exemplary Partnerships 2018 (Basic Manufacturing Skills in partnership with Multicraft International
 Governors Award for Exemplary Partnerships 2018 (Pride of Pelahatchie Marching Band in partnership with the Mississippi Symphonic Band / Mississippi Swing)
 Mrs. Althea Woodson named Secondary Teacher of the Year RCSD 2017
 54 Seniors qualified for $3,067,000 in scholarship money 2017 
 2010 Distinguished Title I School
 Energy Star School 2011, 2012, 2013, 2014, 2015, 2016
 STEM and Academy Design Pilot (Basic Manufacturing Skills in conjunction with Multicraft International and Hinds Community College, Agriculture and Natural Resources, and JROTC)

References

Public high schools in Mississippi
Schools in Rankin County, Mississippi